Kuldeep Singh Dhaliwal is an Indian politician and the MLA representing the Ajnala Assembly constituency also Cabinet Minister in Punjab Government led by CM Bhagwant Mann. He is a member of the Aam Aadmi Party.

Member of Legislative Assembly
Dhaliwal was elected as the MLA in the 2022 Punjab Legislative Assembly election.  He represented the Ajnala Assembly constituency in the Punjab Legislative Assembly. He took oath as a cabinet minister along with nine other MLAs on 19 March at Guru Nanak Dev auditorium of Punjab Raj Bhavan in Chandigarh. Eight ministers including Dhaliwal who took oath were greenhorn (first term) MLAs. The Aam Aadmi Party gained a strong 79% majority in the sixteenth Punjab Legislative Assembly by winning 92 out of 117 seats in the 2022 Punjab Legislative Assembly election. MP Bhagwant Mann was sworn in as Chief Minister on 16 March 2022.

As a cabinet minister in the Mann ministry, Dhaliwal was given the charge of three departments of the Punjab Government:
 Department of Rural Development & Panchayats
 Department of Agriculture and Farmers’ Welfare
 Department of NRI Affairs

Electoral performance

References

Living people
Punjab, India MLAs 2022–2027
Aam Aadmi Party politicians from Punjab, India
Mann ministry
Year of birth missing (living people)